The Samsung Galaxy Win or also known as Galaxy Grand Quattro in some markets is a smartphone developed by Samsung Electronics. It was announced by Samsung on May 20, 2013. The Samsung Galaxy Win has a quad core Cortex-A5 1.2  GHz processor and a RAM of 1 GB, with an internal memory of 8 GB which can be extended to another 64 GB by use of microSD cards. The device also supports internet connectivity through 2G and 3G, apart from Wi-Fi. Navigation systems including A-GPS with Google Maps. Galaxy Grand runs on the Android 4.2.2 Jelly Bean OS. 
 
The smartphone has a 5 MP rear camera that is capable of high resolution photos and video capture. The secondary front-facing camera is an 0.3 MP camera. The primary camera is capable of  video recording at 720*480 at 30 frames per second. The camera comes with an LED flash that is capable of illuminating subjects in low light conditions.

Auto-Focus, Geo-tagging, Touch Focus and Face detection are some of the advanced features supported by the Samsung Galaxy Win I8552. There is an image stabilizer and smile detector, and a basic image editor included.

The Samsung Galaxy Win is powered with  2000 mAh Li-ion that is capable of powering Galaxy Win for up to 10 hours. The 4.7 inches TFT WVGA, Multi-touch screen with 16M colors.

Model variants

GT-I8666

GT-I8552

Galaxy Win Pro(SM-G3812)

Galaxy Win Pro(SM-G3818)

Galaxy Win Pro(SM-G3819)

Galaxy Win Pro(SM-G3819D)

GT-I8558

SCH-I869

SHV-E500S/L

GT-18552B

References

External links 
 India Homepage
 Korea Homepage(SKT)
 China Homepage(CMCC)
 China Homepage(China Telecom)
 China Homepage
 Korea Homepage(LG U+)

Galaxy Grand
Galaxy Grand
Android (operating system) devices
Mobile phones introduced in 2013
Samsung smartphones